Holy Roman Emperor Charles V had won a victory against Protestant forces in the Schmalkaldic War of 1547. Many Protestant princes were unhappy with the religious terms of the Augsburg Interim imposed after this victory. In January 1552, led by Maurice of Saxony, many formed an alliance with Henry II of France at the Treaty of Chambord. In return for French funding and assistance, Henry was promised lands in western Germany. In the ensuing Princes' Revolt, also known as the Second Schmalkaldic War, Charles was driven out of Germany to his ancestral lands in Austria, Innsbruck by the Protestant alliance, while Henry captured the three Rhine Bishoprics of Metz, Verdun and Toul.

In August 1552, weary from three decades of religious civil war, Charles guaranteed Lutheran religious freedoms in the Peace of Passau. The implementation of the Augsburg Interim was cancelled. The Protestant princes taken prisoner during the Schmalkaldic War, John Frederick of Saxony and Philip of Hesse, were released. A precursor to the Peace of Augsburg of September 1555, the Peace of Passau effectively surrendered Charles V's lifelong quest for European religious unity.

In August 1552 his younger brother Archduke Ferdinand I of Austria concluded the Peace of Passau, whereby he formally accepted the Lutheran Augsburg Confession, confirmed by the emperor himself in the 1555 Peace of Augsburg.

References

External links
 The Peace of Passau

Treaties of the Holy Roman Empire
Peace treaties
Schmalkaldic War
16th century in Bavaria
1552 in the Holy Roman Empire
16th-century Christianity
1552 treaties
Charles V, Holy Roman Emperor